The 1993 Los Angeles Rams season was the team’s 56th season in the National Football League and the 48th in Los Angeles.

The Rams looked to improve on their 6–10 record from 1992 and make the playoffs for the first time since 1989. However, the season started off horribly, as the Rams were stomped 36–6 by the Packers in Green Bay in their first game. The Rams, however, rebounded with a 27–0 win over the Pittsburgh Steelers at home. This was followed by a 20–10 loss to the New York Giants and a 28–13 win over the Houston Oilers in Houston. After the win over Houston, the Rams dipped even further, losing their next 5 games to the New Orleans Saints at home (37–6), the Atlanta Falcons in Atlanta (30–24), the Detroit Lions at home (16–13), the arch-rival 49ers in San Francisco (40–17), and the Falcons at home (13–0), to drop to 2–7. After a surprising win over the Washington Redskins at home, the Rams were walloped in their next two games by the 49ers and Cardinals. This assured them of a fourth consecutive losing season and eliminated them from division contention, yet a win over the Saints in New Orleans kept the Rams in the playoff race until a 15–3 loss to the Bengals in Cincinnati eliminated the team from the playoffs for a fourth straight season. This was followed by an embarrassing 42–14 loss at home to the Cleveland Browns and a 20–6 win over the Bears at home.

Ultimately, the Rams finished with a hapless 5–11 record, one win worse than 1992. Worse, the Rams lost ten games by double-digit margins, the first time that had ever happened in franchise history.

To further compound matters, speculation began to mount that the team might relocate to Baltimore. Reports surfaced as the Rams prepared to play the 49ers in San Francisco. The rumors, and further erosion of fan support, exacerbated a 40–17 defeat—their sixth consecutive defeat by San Francisco—and a 2–6 start. The Rams' most recent start of similar quality—or lack thereof—came in 1965, when the Rams played their home games at the L. A. Coliseum and the team was coached by Harland Svare.

However, not all of the developments regarding the Rams constituted a lost season.  In fact, early-season routs of the Oilers and Steelers, including the 27–0 shutout of Pittsburgh at Anaheim Stadium, proved to be rare highlights. Jerome Bettis enjoyed a spectacular rookie year and would go on to have a Hall of Fame career.

Offseason

1993 Draft Class

Undrafted free agents

Personnel

Staff

Roster

Preseason

Regular season

Game summaries

Week 1

Week 2

Week 3

Week 4

Week 5

Week 7
After a week 6 bye, the Rams looked to get back into the win column on a Thursday night matchup with the then-winless Falcons in Atlanta. Los Angeles got off to a good enough start, leading 17–10 at half and 24–17 heading into the fourth quarter, but things fell apart for the Rams in the fourth. Atlanta scored 13 unanswered points in the final quarter to pull away from Los Angeles and register their first win of the 1993 season.

Week 8

Week 9

Week 11
Coming out of their second bye week, Los Angeles once again faced the Atlanta Falcons—this time, in Anaheim. While the Falcons were winless going into their early meeting with the Rams, since then, they had won two of their last three and came into the second matchup at 2–6. While Los Angeles was favored by three, the Rams could not get anything going offensively and lost to the Falcons, 13–0, being shut out at home for the first time since 1984.

Week 12

Week 13

Week 14
Week fourteen saw Los Angeles lose yet again, falling to 3–9 on the season. While the Rams had been considered out of the running for the NFC West Championship for many weeks, with their loss to Phoenix, Los Angeles became mathematically eliminated from the NFC West. The Rams would eventually finish last in the division.

Week 15

Week 16
For week 16, Los Angeles traveled to Cincinnati to face the one-win Bengals. Once again, the Rams were unable to put together a competent offense and were only able to score three points the entire game. With the loss to Cincinnati, Los Angeles found itself mathematically eliminated from playoff contention for the fourth straight season. At the time, the Rams also handed the Bengals only their second win of the season—their first incidentally came against the Rams’ cross-town rival, the Raiders. Ram tackle Irv Eatman stated that “They [Cincinnati] beat us, they beat the Raiders, they played the 49ers tough and obviously they’re just hell on California...they might be looking to put us on the schedule more frequently.”

Week 17

Week 18

Standings

Rumors of team moving
Rumors of relocation affected the Rams’ performance: owner Georgia Frontiere had wanted to break the Rams’ lease of Anaheim Stadium at the end of the 1992 season, and there were over seven thousand no-shows at the November 21 game against the Redskins. At Christmas time, it was revealed that Frontiere wanted to move the Rams to Baltimore, which had lost out surprisingly to Jacksonville, Florida in the recent league expansion bid. This relocation was not approved, but the inadequacy of Anaheim Stadium led Frontiere to move the team to her hometown of St. Louis in 1995.

See also
History of the Los Angeles Rams
Anaheim Stadium

External links
 1993 Los Angeles Rams at Pro-Football-Reference.com

References

Los Angeles Rams
Los Angeles Rams seasons
Los Ang